Bighead or Big Head may refer to:

Fish
 Big-head schizothoracin, a species of fish in the family Cyprinidae found only in Xinjiang, China
 Bighead carp, a species of freshwater fish that is one of the most intensively exploited fishes in aquaculture
 Bighead catshark, a species of deep-sea fish in the family Scyliorhinidae found off the coast of Western Australia
 Bighead goby, either of two species of goby
 Bighead pupfish, a critically endangered species of pupfish in the family Cyprinodontidae
 Bighead sculpin, a species of sculpin fish that is endemic to the Lake Baikal watershed in Siberia, Russia
 Bighead spurdog, a rare and little-known species of dogfish shark in the family Squalidae.

Media

Books 

 Bighead (graphic novel), a graphic novel written and illustrated by Jeffrey Brown

Music 
 "Big Head", a track from the 1997 Cartoon Planet soundtrack album Space Ghost's Musical Bar-B-Que
 "Big Head (song)", a 2002 single by American rapper Ms. Jade from the Girl Interrupted (album)

Television 

Bigheads, a 2017 British television game show
The Bigheads, Bev, Ed and Rachel Bighead, a family of cane toads from animated television series Rocko's Modern Life, see List of Rocko's Modern Life characters

Video games 

 Big head mode, a type of video game cheat code that enlarges the heads of characters

People
 Bighead, a fictional criminal mastermind in American comedy sketch The Ambiguously Gay Duo
 Bighead (record producer), an American record producer, songwriter and DJ.
 Big Head, a fictional character in American comedy Silicon Valley (TV series) 
 Jack Bighead, an American 
 Wu Kwok Hung, a former Hong Kong professional football player nicknamed "Big Head"

Plants
 Centaurea macrocephala, a species of flowering plant in the family Asteraceae with many common names including Bighead knapweed
 Juncus megacephalus, the bighead rush, a plant species native to the United States

Other uses
 Bighead River, a river in Grey County in southern Ontario, Canada
 Hydrophis annandalei, common name bighead sea snake, a species of venomous snake in the subfamily Hydrophiinae

See also
Grosse Tête, Louisiana (French for "big head"), a village in Louisiana, United States
Megalocephalus (Latin for "big head"), an extinct genus of baphetid amphibian from the late Carboniferous